Bronowice is one of 18 districts of Kraków, located in the western part of the city. The name Bronowice comes from a village of same name that is now a part of the district. 

Subdivisions of Bronowice 
Bronowice is divided into smaller subdivisions (osiedles). Here's a list of them.
 Mydlniki
 Bronowice Małe
 Bronowice Małe Wschód
 Osiedle Bronowice Nowe
 Osiedle Widok Zarzecze

Population

References

External links
 Official website of Bronowice
 Biuletyn Informacji Publicznej

Districts of Kraków